Walter Rodekamp (13 January 1941 in Hagen – 10 May 1998 in Hagen) was a German footballer. He spent four seasons in the Bundesliga with Hannover 96. He also represented Germany in three friendlies. Later in his life he suffered from alcoholism.

References

External links 
 

1941 births
1998 deaths
Sportspeople from Hagen
German footballers
Germany international footballers
Association football forwards
Bundesliga players
FC Schalke 04 players
Hannover 96 players
Footballers from North Rhine-Westphalia
20th-century German people